Glenelg Church is a Category B listed building in Glenelg, Highland, Scotland. Of Church of Scotland denomination, the church dates to the 18th century. It is in the presbytery of Lochcarron–Skye and in the parish of Glenelg, Kintail & Lochalsh.

It is a rectangular harled building, with its west gable and rendered and outlined in ashlar. Repairs were carried out between 1821 and 1830, and the interior was re-cast in 1863 and 1929.

An 18th-century bird-cage bellcote is on the west gable, with a stone cross adorning the east. It has a slate roof.

Three windows with 19th-century glazing are in the south elevation.

Graveyard
There is one late 17th-/early 18th-century grave slab, with various others of 19th- and 20th-century dates.

See also
List of listed buildings in Glenelg, Highland

References

External links
Glenelg Church – Places of Worship in Scotland
MHG24475 - Glenelg Church, Churchyard – Highland Historic Environment Record

Churches in Highland (council area)
Church of Scotland churches in Scotland
18th-century Church of Scotland church buildings
Category B listed buildings in Highland (council area)
Listed churches in Scotland
18th-century establishments in Scotland